ABTF–Feirense is a Portuguese professional road cycling team founded in 1983 that is currently based in Albergaria-a-Velha (former  structure), competing on the UCI Continental Circuits.

History
From Santa Maria da Feira, a municipality with a rich cycling tradition, C.D. Feirense established a development team in late 1983 named Feirense–Ruquita that entered the competition the following year.

It was the start of a decade competing in the sport, from 1987 onwards in the professional ranks, where its major achievement was an Volta a Portugal overall victory in 1990, with São Paio de Oleiros native Fernando Carvalho.

On 26 October 2017, to celebrate its centenary, Rodrigo Nunes, C.D. Feirense chairman, revealed the club return to the sport through a partnership with Fernando Vasco, Sport Ciclismo São João de Ver development team manager, and Fernando Pinto.

Team roster

Major wins

 1987
 Young rider classification Volta a Portugal, Orlando Neves
 1988
 Combination classification Volta a Portugal, Fernando Carvalho
 1990
 Stage 1 Troféu Joaquim Agostinho, Andrzej Dulas
  Overall Volta ao Algarve, Fernando Carvalho
  Overall Volta a Portugal, Fernando Carvalho
 Combination classification, Fernando Carvalho
 Prologue
 Stage 7 & 16, Fernando Carvalho
 1992
 Porto–Lisboa, Oleg Logvin
 Young rider classification Volta a Portugal, Quintino Rodrigues
 2018
 Stage 4 Volta ao Alentejo, Edgar Pinto
  Overall Vuelta a la Comunidad de Madrid, Edgar Pinto
 Under-23 classification, Xuban Errazkin
 Stage 1, Edgar Pinto
  Points classification GP Nacional 2 de Portugal, João Matias
 Stage 5, João Matias

Notes

References

External links
 

UCI Continental Teams (Europe)
Cycling teams based in Portugal
Cycling teams established in 1983